John Hayes (born April 7, 1955) is a former professional tennis player from the United States.

Career
Hayes had a five set win over John James in the opening round of the 1980 US Open, before losing in the second round to Guillermo Vilas. In his two other US Open main singles draw appearances, in 1981 and 1984, Hayes failed to get past the first round.

Hayes was a doubles runner-up, with Tracy Delatte, at the 1981 Napa Open. He also made the singles quarter-finals. His other quarter-final appearances on the Grand Prix tour were at Cologne in 1980 and Mexico City in 1981.

Grand Prix career finals

Doubles: 1 (0–1)

References

External links
 
 

1955 births
Living people
American male tennis players
Tennis people from Connecticut
Zonians
People from Cos Cob, Connecticut